Chrysobothrini is a tribe of metallic wood-boring beetles in the family Buprestidae. There are at least 3 genera and 140 described species in Chrysobothrini.

Genera
 Chrysobothris Eschscholtz, 1829
 Knowltonia Fisher, 1935
 Sphaerobothris Semenov-Tian-Shanskij & Richter, 1934

References

 Bellamy, C. L., and G. H. Nelson / Arnett, Ross H. Jr. et al., eds. (2002). "Family 41. Buprestidae Leach, 1815". American Beetles, vol. 2: Polyphaga: Scarabaeoidea through Curculionoidea, 98–112.
 Bellamy, C.L. (2008-2009). A World Catalogue and Bibliography of the Jewel Beetles (Coleoptera: Buprestoidea), Volumes 1-5. Pensoft Series Faunistica No. 76-80.
 Nelson, Gayle H., George C. Walters Jr., R. Dennis Haines, and Charles L. Bellamy (2008). "A Catalog and Bibliography of the Buprestoidea of America North of Mexico". The Coleopterists' Society, Special Publication, no. 4, iv + 274.

Further reading

 Arnett, R. H. Jr., M. C. Thomas, P. E. Skelley and J. H. Frank. (eds.). (21 June 2002). American Beetles, Volume II: Polyphaga: Scarabaeoidea through Curculionoidea. CRC Press LLC, Boca Raton, Florida .
 Arnett, Ross H. (2000). American Insects: A Handbook of the Insects of America North of Mexico. CRC Press.
 Richard E. White. (1983). Peterson Field Guides: Beetles. Houghton Mifflin Company.

Buprestidae
Beetle tribes